Leighton McGregor Burtt (born 17 April 1984) is a New Zealand cricketer, who plays for the Canterbury Wizards. He was born in Christchurch. He is related to Tom Burtt, Noel Burtt and is the son of Mark Burtt. He played for the Wellington Firebirds for the 2010-11 New Zealand cricket season.

External links
 

1984 births
Living people
New Zealand cricketers
Canterbury cricketers
Wellington cricketers
Cricketers from Christchurch
21st-century New Zealand people